The Jockey Club Mile is a Group 2 set weights Thoroughbred horse race in Hong Kong, run at Sha Tin over 1600 metres in November.

In the 2003/2004 racing season, this race was upgraded to a domestic Group 2 event. The race was promoted to International Group 2 status in 2010. The prize money in season 2013/14 is HK$3,500,000, which was increased to HK$3,875,000 in season 2014/15.

Winners

See also
 List of Hong Kong horse races

References
Racing Post:
  The Hong Kong Jockey Club – Introduction of Cathay Pacific Jockey Club Mile (2011/12)
 Racing Information of The Cathay Pacific Jockey Club Mile (2011/12)
 The Hong Kong Jockey Club 

Horse races in Hong Kong